The New Zealand National Party leadership election,  was held in 1936 to select the inaugural leader of the newly founded New Zealand National Party. The election was won by  MP Adam Hamilton.

Background 
The National Party was only recently set up by the defeated remnants of the Reform and United parties. Over the issue of leadership the two parties leaders Gordon Coates and George Forbes were known to personally detest one another, and neither would serve under the other's leadership threatening to divide the budding party. This led to alternative figures to be turned to in order to find a leader, however Coates (who was reluctant to the merger to begin with) was determined that the leader should be a Reform MP.

Candidates

Adam Hamilton 
First elected in 1919, Hamilton had served as the Minister of Internal Affairs and Postmaster-General in the United-Reform Coalition government which governed during the Great Depression. In what some called an act of blackmail, Coates and a group of Reform MPs went as far as to threaten to leave the new National Party and re-establish the old Reform Party unless Hamilton was chosen as leader.

Charles Wilkinson 
It was well known that Forbes was known to prefer Wilkinson and was of the opinion that as a new party National should have a new leader free from association of the coalition government of which Wilkinson was not a member.

Result 
The election was conducted through a members' ballot by National's parliamentary caucus. The following table gives the ballot results:

Aftermath 
Hamilton was essentially chosen as a compromise candidate. Whilst honest, dependable and experienced, lacked the charisma needed for leadership and was too closely linked with the government during the depression by the public. He was never able to properly establish himself as leader, being seen by many as a mere lieutenant of Coates, his former leader. Wilkinson remained an MP until he retired in 1943. He never joined the National Party, however as he habitually voted with them, National did not run a candidate against him in 1938.

Notes

References

National Party leadership
1936
New Zealand National Party leadership election